Ro-42 was an Imperial Japanese Navy Kaichū type submarine of the K6 sub-class. Completed and commissioned in August 1943, she served in World War II and was sunk in June 1944 during her third war patrol.

Design and description
The submarines of the K6 sub-class were versions of the preceding K5 sub-class with greater range and diving depth. They displaced  surfaced and  submerged.

For surface running, the boats were powered by two  diesel engines, each driving one propeller shaft. When submerged each propeller was driven by a  electric motor. They could reach  on the surface and  underwater.

The boats were armed with four internal bow  torpedo tubes and carried a total of ten torpedoes. They were also armed with a single  L/40 anti-aircraft gun and two single  AA guns.

Construction and commissioning

Ro-42 was laid down as Submarine No. 208 on 27 April 1942 by the Sasebo Navy Yard at Sasebo, Japan. She was renamed Ro-42 on 25 September 1942 and was attached provisionally to the Maizuru Naval District that day. She was launched on 25 October 1942  and was completed and commissioned on 31 August 1943.

Service history

Upon commissioning, Ro-42 was attached formally to the Maizuru Naval District and assigned to Submarine Squadron 11 for workups. On 30 November 1943, she was reassigned to Submarine Division 34 in the 6th Fleet, and on 4 December 1943 she departed Maizuru, Japan, bound for Truk, which she reached on 12 December 1943.

First war patrol

Ro-40 got underway from Truk on 23 December 1943 to begin her first war patrol, assigned a patrol area off Espiritu Santo in the New Hebrides. YO-159 suffered such serious damage that U.S. forces later scuttled her. Ro-42 returned to Truk on 24 January 1944. She took aboard torpedoes from the auxiliary submarine tender  there on 28 January 1944.

Operation Hailstone
During Ro-42′s stay at Truk, U.S. Navy Task Force 58 conducted Operation Hailstone, a major attack on Truk by carrier aircraft supported by anti-shipping sweeps around the atoll by surface warships, on 17 and 18 February 1944. Ro-42 and the submarines  and  put to sea on 17 February in an attempt to intercept the attacking ships. Ro-42 was unsuccessful, and returned to Truk on 19 February 1944.

Second war patrol

Ro-42 began her second war patrol on 25 February 1944, departing Truk to head for a patrol area east of Kusaie. After she arrived off Kwajalein, she reported on 4 March 1944 that the island′s waters were too heavily patrolled by Allied patrol boats for her to approach it for a reconnaissance. Ro-42 also began to suffer from malfunctioning equipment. She was ordered to return to her patrol.

On 16 March 1944, Ro-42 received orders to move  to the west-southwest, and on 18 March to move another  to the west. She did not find the task force, and she returned to Truk on 28 March 1944.

April–May 1944

She returned to Truk on 14 April. On 23 April 1944 she departed Truk bound for Yokosuka, Japan, which she reached on 30 April 1944.

On 15 May 1944, Ro-42 departed Yokosuka with the commander of Submarine Division 34 embarked and orders to conduct a reconnaissance of the American fleet anchorage at Majuro and then proceed to an area north-northeast of Kwajalein. While she was at sea, she received orders to postpone the Majuro reconnaissance until 10 June 1944. On 10 June 1944, she was operating in the Marshall Islands when she was ordered to reconnoiter both Majuro and Kwajalein.

Loss

After Bangust  closed, made visual contact, and flashed a challenge, Ro-42 crash-dived. Bangust searched for the submerged Ro-42 for the next eight hours and regained contact on sonar on the morning of 11 June 1944. Bangust conducted three unsuccessful 24-projectile Hedgehog attacks as Ro-42 made evasive maneuvers such as frequent hard turns and sudden changes in speed. However, her fourth Hedgehog attack resulted in a large underwater explosion that damaged Bangust′s hull. During the morning of 11 June, a large oil slick was sighted on the surface.

On 13 June 1944 the Combined Fleet activated Operation A-Go for the defense of the Mariana Islands, and that day Vice Admiral Takagi ordered all available Japanese submarines to deploy east of the Marianas, with Ro-42 ordered to head there at flank speed. On 16 June 1944, she was assigned to Submarine Group B and ordered to move to an area southeast of the Marianas, and on 22 June 1944 she was ordered to return to Truk. She acknowledged none of the orders. On 12 July 1944, the Imperial Japanese Navy declared Ro-42 to be presumed lost with all 73 hands. She was stricken from the Navy list on 10 August 1944.

Notes

References
 

 

Ro-35-class submarines
Kaichū type submarines
Ships built by Sasebo Naval Arsenal
1942 ships
World War II submarines of Japan
Japanese submarines lost during World War II
World War II shipwrecks in the Pacific Ocean
Maritime incidents in June 1944
Ships lost with all hands
Submarines sunk by United States warships